Aparna Sindhoor (born 1970/1971) is a choreographer, dancer, and teacher from Mysore, India.
She is the Artistic Director of Navarasa Natyalya Dance Theater.

Education 
Sindhoor began dancing at the age of five, first learning from her mother. She trained in Bharatanatyam for approximately 15 years with K. Venkatalakshamma, who emphasizes Abhinaya (facial expression) and graceful Jathis (pure dance compositions). She also studied singing and theatre. 

She holds a Master's degree in English, and a bachelor's degree in Dance, literature and Dramatics. She received her doctorate in "Dance, Women and Culture" from Boston University.

Career and Awards 
Sindhoor has given professional performances since her arangetram (graduation solo recital) in 1989.

She moved to the United States in 1997/1998.

Sindhoor founded the Navarasa Dance Theatre Sindhoor in Mysore, India, in 1991 with her husband, film director SM Raju, and fellow choreographer Anil Natyaveda. After moving to the United States, the theatre was based out of Boston, Massachusetts. In 2012, Sindhoor developed Encounter, a dance-theatre performance based on a short story by Mahashweta Devi, for Navarasa.

In 2013 Sindhoor choreographed "Visions of an Ancient Dreamer" for Brandeis theatre students.

Sindhoor's choreography was included in Boston-based Underground Railway Theater's "A Disappearing Number" in 2014. 

Sindhoor's works have been showcased in the US, Canada, Germany and India, including venues and festivals such as the Jacob's Pillow, Lincoln Center, New Jersey Performance Arts Center, La Mama and New Haven Festival of Arts and Ideas. She was one of the choreographers selected for the New England Foundation for the Arts’ RDDI program.

In 2022 she choreographed EnActe Arts' “The Jungle Book: Rudyard Revised" in Palo Alto, California.

She is a part time faculty member at Santa Monica College.

Awards 
Sindhoor earned a Gold Medal in dance from Mysore University.

In 2013, Sindhoor received the NPN Creation Funds Award for My Dear Muddu Palani. In the same year, she was also nominated for Los Angeles Stage Alliance Ovation Award for Choreography.

In 2020 Sindhoor received $1,000 from the AAPI Civic Engagement Fund to create a digital piece of art to encourage voter turnout.

Dance theater works
 River Rites (2001)
 A Story and A Song (2007)
 Encounter (2012)
 Snake and Ladder (2017)
 The Vote Dance (2020)
 The Naked Line (2021)
 Plantation Talas
 Refugee Ragas
 The Hunt

References

External links
 Aparna Sindhoor's Navarasa Dance Theater
 Varnam Official Website

Living people
Kannada people
Artists from Boston
Boston University alumni
Bharatanatyam exponents
Indian emigrants to the United States
Performers of Indian classical dance
Indian classical choreographers
Artists from Mysore
Indian women choreographers
Indian choreographers
Dancers from Karnataka
Year of birth missing (living people)
Women artists from Karnataka